New York University Abu Dhabi (NYUAD) is a degree granting, portal campus of New York University serving as a private, liberal arts college, located in Abu Dhabi, United Arab Emirates.

Together with New York University in New York City and New York University Shanghai, the portal campus is part of NYU's Global Network University. It opened in 2008 at a temporary site for conferences and cultural events. The academic program opened in September 2010 at the university's provisional downtown site; it was later moved in 2014 to the permanent campus built on Saadiyat Island, Abu Dhabi.

In 2021, the university welcomed 530 new entrants from the Class of 2025 who were selected from more than 17,300 applicants from all over the world (an acceptance rate of about 3%).

The university announced that it had already produced "17 Rhodes Scholars since welcoming its first class in 2010, more Rhodes Scholars per student than any university in the world."

History and background 
In October 2007, New York University announced its intention to open a complete branch campus in Abu Dhabi, financed by the government of the United Arab Emirates. New York University planned the Abu Dhabi campus, and the funding mainly came from the UAE government.

The school was first opened in 2008 on a site in downtown Abu Dhabi, where it held various public events such as academic conferences, workshops, and performances. Alfred Bloom, former president of Swarthmore College, was appointed to lead NYU Abu Dhabi as vice chancellor in September 2008. NYU Abu Dhabi accepted its first class of 150 students in September 2010. As of 2010, the college offered liberal arts and science subjects, including engineering. It welcomed Mariët Westermann, former vice president at The Andrew W. Mellon Foundation, former provost of NYU Abu Dhabi, former director of NYU's Institute of Fine Arts, and art historian, as a second Vice Chancellor in August 2019.

New York University moved the Abu Dhabi campus to a new site in 2014 in the Marina district of Saadiyat Island. It was designed by Rafael Viñoly, an Uruguayan architect, and built by Al-Futtaim Carillion. NYU eventually plans to have 2,000 students on campus. The university plans to open a graduate school and make the school a center for research.

President Bill Clinton, the 42nd President of the United States and founder of Clinton Foundation, was the keynote speaker at NYU Abu Dhabi's inaugural commencement ceremony 
 for 140 graduates held on May 25, 2014.

Campus and locations

19 Washington Square North
From its location in Greenwich Village, 19 Washington Square North (19 WSN) is the gateway to NYU Abu Dhabi at Washington Square. With a gross 11,400 square-foot, 19 WSN is the academic home for NYUAD students, faculty, and administrators who are living in New York as well as the connection center for the two campuses. Global Network Seminars link students in New York and Abu Dhabi for a shared educational experience. A classroom equipped with videoconference equipment is connected to a similar classroom in Abu Dhabi and enables joint seminars based on exchange and cooperation between NYU students on both campuses. 19 WSN has a media center, conference rooms, classrooms, gallery space, a lounge and office space for NYUAD Staff and Faculty.

Saadiyat Island campus

A permanent campus is on Saadiyat Island within a cultural district for the city that houses the Louvre Abu Dhabi and is also planned to house the Zayed National Museum and the Guggenheim Abu Dhabi museum. Architect Rafael Viñoly was named master planner for the campus, designing it to combine elements of NYU's Greenwich Village environment and traditional Islamic villages. The pedestrian campus consists of state-of-the-art classrooms, library, and information technology facilities; laboratories; academic buildings; student dormitories; faculty and residential housing; and athletic and performance facilities. The campus covers nearly 40 acres and also offers a number of public spaces, including theater and performance halls, an art gallery, conference center, and various retail offerings. The construction costs of the NYUAD Saadiyat Campus were entirely funded by the Abu Dhabi government, as will be the operating costs and any future expansions. 

Reports have been made since the beginning of the project of abuse of foreign construction workers at the site, including the arbitrary withholding of wages, unsafe working conditions and failure of the construction companies to pay recruitment fees to laborers. In December 2013, The Guardian wrote, in a multi-part report, that conditions for the foreign workers at the construction site for the campus amount to modern-day slavery.

Academics
As a liberal arts college and research university, NYU Abu Dhabi offers 25 majors in the area of Arts and Humanities, Social Sciences, Science, and Engineering that culminate into a B.A. or B.S. degree. As a prerequisite for graduation, students are required to take courses from the core curriculum, which encompasses topics in world literature, social studies, arts and natural science. Over their college years, undergraduates take three 3-week courses in January that count toward their graduation requirement. Students' education also includes a capstone project in their senior year, a project similar to a senior thesis. Additionally, students are encouraged to study up to two semesters at New York University's Global Network sites in Accra, Berlin, Buenos Aires, Florence, London, Madrid, Paris, Prague and Shanghai. The university further provides regional study trips within the United Arab Emirates and to countries in Africa, Middle East and Western Asia.

See the table with Major and Minor options:

Selected graduates of NYU Abu Dhabi will be offered special considerations to enroll at New York University's graduate professional schools and programs.

The university also offers graduate and executive education programs: 11 global PhD fellowship programs and 2 master's programs.

Admissions

The university has a small and diverse student body, with a total student enrollment of about 670 in 2014. The first class (class of 2014) consisted of 148 students from 40 countries. The class of 2015 is made up of 161 students from 60 countries. The class of 2016 is made up of 151 students from 65 countries. The class of 2022 is made up of 389 students from 84 countries. The number of applications to NYUAD has grown rapidly, with 15,520 individuals submitting dual NYU Abu Dhabi and NYU New York applications and 2,470 primary NYUAD applications.

Nowadays, NYU Abu Dhabi has a student body with more than 115 nationalities that speak more than 115 languages.

The university has committed to ensuring students and their families take on no debt in financing their education. In order to commit to this principle, the university practices need-blind admissions.

Student life

NYUAD has over 60 student groups, providing a variety of opportunities for student involvement outside of the classroom. Categories include Academic and Professional; Art, Literature, and Media; Cooking and Food; Culture and Religious; Music and Performance; Outreach and Engagement; Environment and Sustainability; Recreational; Technology; and Sports and Athletics.

NYUAD also boasts a weekly student newspaper The Gazelle, founded in 2013 by Alistair Blacklock and Amanda Randone.

Athletics and recreation

NYU Abu Dhabi is the home of the Desert Falcons sports teams and competes in the Abu Dhabi Inter-University Sports League (ADISL) which runs from October through May and sees competitive play for men's and women's teams against other Abu Dhabi universities in football (soccer), basketball, table tennis, cricket, volleyball, and badminton.

NYU Abu Dhabi's campus has modern, competitive level sports and recreation facilities including a 50-meter swimming pool, performance gymnasium and indoor track, fitness center, climbing wall, squash and racquetball courts, football pitch and multi-use fields, an outdoor track, tennis courts, as well as basketball and multi-use courts.

Battle of the Bands at NYUAD 

NYU Abu Dhabi started hosting the UAE's first Battle of the Bands competition in early 2017.

Faculty and research 

NYU Abu Dhabi faculty and researchers come from universities all over the world to work in its multidisciplinary labs and collaborative research centers.

An article in Nature Asia states that NYU Abu Dhabi chemists developed thin films of ‘smart’ polymers that respond to heat and light, a breakthrough in research that could revolutionize how energy is generated and consumed. The smart materials project is led by award-winning NYU Abu Dhabi Associate Chemistry Professor Pance Naumov, a recipient of the Humboldt Research Award.

NYU Abu Dhabi's Library of Arabic Literature (LAL) offers Arabic editions and English translations of significant works of Arabic literature, with an emphasis on the seventh to nineteenth centuries. In its first three years, LAL published nine volumes — on literature, law, religion, biography, and mysticism — and more are in production. LAL won high praise in an article by the Times Literary Supplement that said, “…the study and teaching of medieval Arabic thought and literary creativity will be revolutionized” by the library's work.

Akkasah Center for Photography at NYU Abu Dhabi collects antique photos from around the Middle East to capture the region's societal transformation over the last century. In its first year, more than 10,000 photos were curated.

NYU Abu Dhabi is an international partner in the XENON100 and XENON1T dark matter experiments taking place at the Gran Sasso Laboratory in Italy. Scientists recorded results that challenge several dark matter models and a longstanding claim of dark matter detection. Papers detailing the results were published in the journals Science and Physical Review Letters. NYU Abu Dhabi Associate Professor of Physics Francesco Arneodo is a collaborating author and leads NYU Abu Dhabi's XENON research group of graduate students, postdoctoral associates, and student interns.

Collaborating researchers, including scientists from the Center for Global Sea-level Change (CSLC) at NYU Abu Dhabi, published a 2014 paper in the journal Nature that found one of the most sensitive and critical areas of the Earth's ice in West Antarctica is being affected by sea-level changes in the north and tropical Atlantic, which has been warming for over 30 years.

In September 2021, NYU Abu Dhabi announced the launch of a Strategic Philanthropy Initiative to promote philanthropy within the Middle East and North Africa region.

Notable faculty 
Notable current and former faculty include:
 Kwame Anthony Appiah, Professor of Philosophy and Law
 Thomas H. Bender, Professor of History
 Godfried Toussaint, Research Professor of Computer Science
 Elias Khoury, Global Distinguished Professor of Modern Arabic Literature
 Anthony Kronman, Global Professor, New York University Abu Dhabi
 Cyrus Patell, Associate Dean of Humanities
 Iván Szelényi, Emeritus Dean of Social Sciences
 Werner Sollors, Global Professor of Literature
 Eugene Trubowitz, Global Professor of Mathematics
 Carol Gilligan, Visiting Professor of Humanities and Applied Psychology
 Kevin O'Rourke, Professor of Economics
 Robert C. Allen, Professor of Economics

Notable alumni 
 Shamma Al Bastaki, Emirati visual artist
 Mateusz Mach, entrepreneur and investor
 Hamda Al Qubaisi, Emirati motorsports racing driver

Community programs 

The Sheikh Mohamed bin Zayed Scholars Program (SMSP) is one of two community programs operated by NYU Abu Dhabi. SMSP is intended for undergraduate students at institutes of higher education in the United Arab Emirates other than New York University Abu Dhabi. The other community program is the NYUAD Summer Academy Program which is open to Abu Dhabi-based high school students entering their 11th year. Recipients take academic courses and receive English training and leadership training. They also travel to the United States to see the university's New York campus.

Controversies
An article appeared in The New York Times regarding labor violations during construction, with workers complaining of their passports being confiscated and of being charged a year's wages in advance to work for little money in poor conditions. Such criticisms have been described as "one of the factors at play in a faculty vote of no-confidence in President John Sexton’s leadership in 2013 [and] Sexton retiring as president in 2016."

In March 2015, NYU professor Andrew Ross was prevented from boarding a plane to NYU Abu Dhabi, prompting him to decry what he felt was an attack on his academic freedom. As he told Slate magazine, "If someone with my kind of profile and especially my official position ... can be treated this way, what is the value of the protections that are promised for less high-profile faculty in Abu Dhabi? ... My passage to and from the UAE is supposed to be protected, and we’ve been told by our administration that they have agreements with our Abu Dhabi partners about protecting academic freedoms, and now it turns out that they really don’t have that kind of influence.”

Additionally, there have been debates about how LGBTQ students, Jewish/Israeli students, and other groups of students are treated at NYU Abu Dhabi. For example, as the editorial board of one of NYU's student newspapers wrote, "over the years, many have expressed concerns about discrimination against gay students at NYU Abu Dhabi."

See also
 Americans in the United Arab Emirates

References

External links 
 

 
2010 establishments in the United Arab Emirates
Universities and colleges in the Emirate of Abu Dhabi
Educational institutions established in 2010